Alan Cumyn (born 8 January 1960) is a Canadian novelist who lives in Ottawa, Ontario.

Biography 

Born in Ottawa, Alan Cumyn studied at Royal Roads Military College in 1983, and Queen's University before earning an M.A. in Creative Writing and English Literature at the University of Windsor. He has lived across Canada and in China and Indonesia, and worked variously as a geologist's assistant, group home manager, tai chi instructor, English teacher, program officer in international development, human rights researcher and freelance writer. Cumyn's fiction focuses on personal and political relations, often in a cross-cultural context. He now lives in Ottawa with his wife and two daughters.

In 2016 he won the Writers' Trust of Canada's Vicky Metcalf Award for Literature for Young People for his body of work.

Works
Waiting for Li Ming - 1993
Between Families and the Sky - 1995
Man of Bone - 1998 - (Winner of the Ottawa Book Award)
Burridge Unbound - 2000 - shortlisted for the 2000 Giller Prize
Losing It - 2001
The Secret Life of Owen Skye - 2002 (Received a Mr. Christie's Book Award; nominated for a Governor General's Award)
The Sojourn - 2003
After Sylvia - 2004 (Nominated for the 2005 TD Canadian Children's Literature Award)
The Famished Lover - 2006 (longlisted for the Giller Prize)
Dear Sylvia - 2008  (Winner 2009 Silver Birch Express Award; short-listed Canadian Library Association's Book of the Year for Children)
Tilt - 2011 (selected by the Junior Library Guild as one of the best young adult novels of 2011)
Hot Pterodactyl Boyfriend - 2016
North to Benjamin - 2018 (Bank Street Best Children's Book of the Year Selection Title)

References
 W. H. New, ed. Encyclopedia of Literature in Canada. Toronto: University of Toronto Press, 2002.

 Author's Website: https://web.archive.org/web/20110903150747/http://www.alancumyn.com/acumyn.html (as of September 3, 2011)

External links

 Online interview from CBC Words at Large
 Alan Cumyn's web page
 Writer's Union profile on Alan Cumyn

1960 births
Living people
Canadian male novelists
Writers from Ottawa
20th-century Canadian novelists
21st-century Canadian novelists
Canadian writers of young adult literature
20th-century Canadian male writers
21st-century Canadian male writers